Elizabeth Rose Berridge, Baroness Berridge (born 22 March 1972) is a British Conservative politician and member of the House of Lords.

Life
Born and educated in the county of Rutland, Lady Berridge attended Vale of Catmose College and Rutland College in Oakham. She then studied law at Emmanuel College, Cambridge, and undertook barrister's training at the Inns of Court School of Law in London. Her professional career was as a barrister before she was appointed executive director of the Conservative Christian Fellowship in 2006.

She fought Stockport for the Conservatives in the 2005 general election.

Baroness Berridge is also part of the Advisory Council of the Foundation for Relief and Reconciliation in the Middle East which supports the work of Canon Andrew White, the "vicar of Baghdad".

She is a founding and steering committee member of the International Panel of Parliamentarians for Freedom of Religion or Belief.

House of Lords
On 18 January 2011, Berridge was created a life peeress as Baroness Berridge, of The Vale of Catmose in the County of Rutland, and was introduced in the House of Lords on 20 January 2011. where she sits on the Conservative benches. Born in 1972, she was the second youngest female member of the House of Lords, after Baroness Lane-Fox of Soho.

She was co-chair of the All-Party Parliamentary Group for International Freedom of Religion or Belief.

Baroness Berridge was appointed Parliamentary Under-Secretary of State for the School System at the Department for Education, and Parliamentary Under-Secretary of State for Women at the Department for International Trade, by Prime Minister Boris Johnson in February 2020. She left the government during the cabinet reshuffle on 17 September 2021.

Awards 
On 5 October 2017, Baroness Berridge was awarded the 2017 International Religious Liberty Award by the International Center for Law and Religion Studies and J. Reuben Clark Law Society.

External links
Personal website
Baroness Berridge, TheyWorkForYou

References

1972 births
Living people
Conservative Party (UK) life peers
Life peeresses created by Elizabeth II
People from Rutland
Alumni of Emmanuel College, Cambridge
People educated at Catmose College